Pillalu Diddina Kapuram is a 1993 Indian Telugu-language drama film, produced by Sangisetty Dasaradha and Amara Srisaila Rao for Konark Movies and directed by Perala. It stars Jagapathi Babu, Divyavani, Kinnera, Master Tarun with music composed by Vidyasagar.

Plot
The film begins with the love birds Raghu & Padma. Once, Raghu visits his elder sister's daughter Aliveelu's wedding which breaks up due to dowdy problems. So, Raghu steps in and marries Aliveelu. After returning, he learns that Padma is pregnant, which forces him to marry her too. Thereafter, Raghu backs for Aliveelu but is unable to know her whereabouts and also hears her as pregnant. Both of them give birth to baby boys, Anji & Prasad, who look like identical twins. Time passes, the boys grow up. In time, the sibling meets accidentally and discover themselves as the progeny of the same father. The rest of the story how they set out to unite their respective mothers with their father.

Cast
 Jagapathi Babu as Raghu
 Divyavani as Padma 
 Kinnera as Aliveelu
 Master Tarun as Anji & Prasad (dual role)
 Sivaji Raja as Jackie 
 Babu Mohan as Thadika / Thadi Kanna Rao
 Jeet Mohan Mitra as Vamana Rao
 Annapurna as Annapurnamma
 Jayalalita as Rathi
 Y. Vijaya as Vardhanamma

Soundtrack

Music composed by Vidyasagar. Music released on Supreme Music Company.

References

External links

1993 films
Films scored by Vidyasagar
1990s Telugu-language films